Charu Nivedita (born 18 December 1953) is a Tamil writer based in Chennai, India. His novel Zero Degree was longlisted for the 2013 edition of Jan Michalski Prize for Literature. Zero Degree was inducted into the prestigious '50 Writers, 50 Books - The Best of Indian Fiction', published by HarperCollins. Nivedita uses postmodern themes in his writing. He was selected as one among 'Top Ten Indians of the Decade 2001 - 2010' by The Economic Times. He is inspired by Marquis de Sade and Andal. His columns appear in magazines such as Art Review Asia, The Asian Age and Deccan Chronicle.

Bibliography

Works available in English
 Zero Degree (Novel)
 Marginal Man (Novel)
 To Byzantium: A Turkey Travelogue 
 Unfaithfully Yours (Collection of articles)
 Morgue Keeper (Selected short stories)
 Towards a Third Cinema (Articles on Latin American Cinema)

Novels
 Existentialism and Fancy Baniyan  - Tamil / Malayalam
 Zero Degree  - Tamil / English / Malayalam
 Rasa leela 
 Kaamarooba Kathaigal 
 Thegam 
 Marginal Man (Tamil title was named 'Exile') - Tamil / English
 Naanthaan Aurangzeb

Short stories
  Carnataka Murasum Naveena Tamil Ilakiyathin Meethana Oru Amaipiyal Aayvum  - Collection of short stories, published along with Nagaarchunan and Sylvia aka M.D.Muthukumarasamy
Nano 
 Madumitha Sonna Pambu Kathaigal 
 Shakespeare-in Minnanjal Mugavari (Shakespeare's e-mail address)
 Kadal Kanni  - Translated short stories from world Literature 
 Oorin miga azhagaana Pen – Translated short stories from world Literature 
 Muthukkal Pathu  - Selected short stories
 Morgue Keeper - Selected short stories in English in Kindle
 Diabolically Yours in Exotic Gothic Volume 5

Collection of articles
 Konal Pakkangal - Part 1 
 Konal Pakkankal - Part 2 
 Konal Pakkangal - Part 3 
 Dhisai Ariyum Paravaigal 
 Moodupani Saalai 
 Varambu Meeriya Pradhigal 
 Thappu Thalangal 
 Kalagam Kaadhal Isai 
 Dante-yin Siruththai 
 Yenakku Kuzhandhaigalai Pidikadhu 
 Kadavulum Nanum 
 Kalaiyum Kaamamum 
 Kadavulum Saithaanum 
 Sarasam Sallabam Saamiyar 
 Vaazhvadhu eppadi 
 Ketta vaarththai 
 Malawi endroru Desam
 Azaadhi Azaadhi Azaadhi 
 Adhigaaram Amaidhi Sudhanthiram 
 Kanavugalin mozhipeyarppaalan 
 Manamkoththi paravai 
 Enge Un Kadavul? 
 Kadaisip Pakkangal 
 Vetrulagavaasiyin Diarykkuripugal 
 Pazhuppu Nirap Pakkangal - Part 1 
 Pazhuppu Nirap Pakkangal - Part 2 
 Pazhuppu Nirap Pakkangal - Part 3 
 Nadodiyin Natkuripugal 
 Medusavin Mathukoppai 
 Kanavu Cappucino Konjam Chatting - 1
 Kanavu Cappucino Konjam Chatting - 2
 Kanavugalin Mozhipayarpalan
 Itchaigalin Irulveli
 To Byzantium - A Turkey Travelogue (Tamil title was named 'Nilavu Theyatha Thesam)  - Tamil/English
 Unfaithfully Yours - Collection of articles
 Mazhaiya Peigirathu

Play
 Rendaam aattam

Cinema review
 Latin American Cinema 
 Cinema: Alainthuthiribavanin Azhagiyal 
 Theeraakaadhali 
 Cinema Cinema 
 Naragaththilirundhu oru kural 
 Kanavugalin Nadanam 
 Towards a Third Cinema
 Oliyin Perunchalanam

Collection of interviews
 Ozhunginmaiyin Veriyaattam 
 Ichchaigalin Irulveli (Second edition of the erstwhile Paaliyal - Oru Urayaadal  that comes with the new title)

Question and Answers
 Arugil Varaadhey 
 Aram Porul Inbam

Awards and accolades
 Zero Degree was inducted into the prestigious '50 Writers, 50 Books - The Best of Indian Fiction', edited by Chandra Siddan and Pradeep Sebastian, published by HarperCollins.
 He was selected as one among 'Top Ten Indians of the Decade 2001 - 2010' by The Economic Times.
 Zero Degree was long-listed for the 2013 edition of Jan Michalski Prize.
 Zero Degree was selected as one of the fifteen incredible Indian novels.
The Hindu included him in its list of 'Manathil Pathintha Mugangal 25' (Twenty Five Eminent Personalities of Tamil Nadu) in its Diwali Malar 2014.

Literary contemporaries on Charu Nivedita
Vahni Capildeo places Charu Nivedita on par with Vladimir Nabokov, James Joyce and Jean Genet, in her article in the Caribbean Review of Books.
In his foreword to the Malayalam translation of Zero Degree, Paul Zacharia wrote, "It is like an open experimental laboratory. Amidst the smoke, noxious vapors, and beautiful imagery, I experienced a wondrous journey."
Tarun Tejpal wrote that Zero Degree is remarkable for its experimental voice and its varying and shifting tonalities. 
Anil Menon considers Zero Degree bold and ambitious.
Translator Jason Grunebaum considers Zero Degree "wildly exciting".

Public events

Literary festivals
 Charu Nivedita was one of the invitees for the 2010 and 2011 editions of Almost Island Dialogues, New Delhi.
 He was one of the invitees for the Hay Festival 2010, Thiruvananthapuram.
 Hay Festival 2011, Thiruvananthapuram was inaugurated at the British Deputy High Commission, Chennai by Mike Nithavrianakis, the then Deputy High Commissioner, followed by a reading of an excerpt from Charu Nivedita's works.
 He was one of the invitees for the 2012 edition of Jaipur Literary Festival.
 He was felicitated at the Twenty Sixth Anniversary  Celebration of Katha, a monthly literary magazine of Sambad (an Odia daily) at Bhubaneswar on 10 February 2013.
He was one of the invitees for the Brahmaputra Literary Festival 2017.
He was one of the panelists in Kerala Literature Festival 2017.
He was one of the speakers the Manipal International Literature and Arts Platform 2018

Film festivals
Charu Nivedita was invited as the Guest of Honour on 10 March 2002 at the National Folklore Support Centre Folk Festival, Chennai.
He inaugurated the Third SIO Samvedana Vedhi International Film Festival, 2010, organised by the Students Islamic Organisation of India wing of the University of Calicut.
He inaugurated the International Film Festival of Tamil Nadu 2010, Chennai, organised by the International Tamil Film Academy and Seventh Channel Communications.
He inaugurated the Fourth Panchajanyam International Film Festival 2011 at Chittur, Kerala.
 He inaugurated the valedictory session of the Third International Film Festival 2011, Kochi, which was jointly organised by the Kerala State Chalachitra Academy, Heart Light Association and the Ernakulam District Information Office.
 At the 2013 Chennai Rainbow Film Festival (LGBT Film Festival), presented by Alliance Française de Madras, he participated in the 'Panel Discussion on Media Portrayal of LGBT issues.'

Lectures and meets
 Charu Nivedita delivered the 2009 Paul Chirakkarode Memorial Lecture at Kottayam.
 He was invited to speak at the valedictory function of ‘Thattakaperuma,' a series of programmes to observe the second death anniversary of Kovilan, Malayalam writer at Thrissur on 3 June 2012.
He delivered the commemoration speech at the 'Bob Marley Cultural Fest' on 11 May 2010 at Kochi.
He was one of the panelists at the Outlook Speak Out debate 2010, Chennai on the subject 'Moral Policing in a Democracy'.

Social activism

He was invited as the chief guest of Sambavas' annual celebrations (a Dalit caste) at Chalakudy in Kerala on 11 May 2008.
He inaugurated a meeting and spoke among the adivasis protesting against wanton clay mining at Velichikala, near Kollam.
He addressed a gathering of Plachimada villagers who were on a relay hunger strike against Coca-Cola's wanton over-drawing of groundwater and polluting water bodies.
He marched with villagers protesting against Coca-Cola and Pepsi's wanton overdrawing of groundwater at Kanjikode, near Palakkad on 29 August 2008.
He inaugurated a symposium on Mullaiperiyar Dam issue organized by 'Uyiru', a joint cultural forum of Tamil and Malayalam writers and social activists on 7 July 2012 at Kottayam.

'Zero Degree' in Academics
 Zero Degree was on the curriculum in Spring 2010 in a Comparative World Literature course, taught by Jordan Smith, at California State University, Long Beach (CSULB).
 University of Rochester has included Zero Degree in its translation program.
 The Malayalam translation of Zero Degree is in the curriculum for postgraduate students at the Mahatma Gandhi University, Kottayam.

Quotations
 "I convert my schizoid (state) into an art."
 "There is nothing like planning in my literature, at any point of time. It's something which gets written between the schizoid state and dreams. Hence, with this same reason, I cannot comment on my writing. Like how I don't accept the roles of a father, a son, a lover, a friend – I despise the role of a writer too. My writing is nothing but the brush strokes of a person trying to escape from hell."
"Hatred is a disease."

See also
 List of Indian writers

References

External links
 An excerpt from Zero Degree
 Morgue Keeper Short Story

1953 births
Living people
Tamil-language writers
Writers from Chennai
Indian postmodern writers
Metafiction
Surrealist dramatists and playwrights
Indian surrealist writers
20th-century Indian dramatists and playwrights
Dramatists and playwrights from Tamil Nadu
Novelists from Tamil Nadu
People from Nagapattinam district